The Official Secrets Act 1911 (1 & 2 Geo 5 c 28) is an Act of the Parliament of the United Kingdom. It replaces the Official Secrets Act 1889.

The Act was introduced in response to public alarm at reports of wide-scale espionage, some of them fomented by popular novels and plays that dramatized the threat, supposedly from Germany, at a time of a rapid naval expansion. Its provisions were extensive, with heavy penalties for any reporting or sketching of military, naval or air defence installations, or the harbouring of people suspected of gathering such intelligence.

It has been amended several times; most importantly the "catch-all" provisions contained in section 2 of the Act were repealed and replaced by the Official Secrets Act 1989. The Act applies in the United Kingdom, the Isle of Man, the Channel Islands, and in overseas crown territories and colonies. It also applies to British subjects anywhere else in the world. In the Republic of Ireland, the Act was repealed by section 3 of the Official Secrets Act 1963.

Background
The Act was passed during a febrile period of "spy fever" in the years leading up to the First World War, with widespread anti-German sentiment in Britain provoked by the Anglo-German naval arms race and events such as the Kruger telegram and the Agadir Crisis. These fuelled numerous press and literary accounts of imaginary German undercover activities, such as William Le Queux's 1909 book, Spies for the Kaiser. Plotting the downfall of England.  By the end of 1908, newspapers were receiving hundreds of fanciful letters detailing the activities of suspected German spies. For example, a letter in the Morning Post in May 1907 claimed that there were 90,000 German reservists and spies in Britain, with weapons caches for them in every major city, whilst an article in the 1909 edition of The Annual Register alleged that 50,000 Mauser rifles stored in a cellar near Charing Cross were intended for the 66,000 German reservists rumoured to be in London. Invasion fiction also became extremely popular, with novels such as Erskine Childers' 1903 The Riddle of the Sands, Le Queux's The Invasion of 1910 serialised by the Daily Mail in 1906, and Saki's When William Came of 1913.

The 1911 Agadir Crisis, in which the UK threatened war with Germany, was the final trigger for the government. 
In an atmosphere of widespread hysteria, it introduced the act in the House of Lords on 25 July 1911. The act was then rushed through Parliament, with little debate or opposition, passing through all of its stages in a single day, 18 August 1911, and receiving the Royal assent four days later on 22 August. The act, with its extremely wide-ranging powers, replaced the earlier Official Secrets Act 1889 that had provided criminal sanctions only for breaches which could be shown to be contrary to the public interest. Section 1 of the act contained tough provisions against espionage, which were extended by a 1962 Law Lords ruling to cover other activities such as sabotage and physical interference. Section 2 dealt with unauthorised disclosure of information held by servants of the State, making it a criminal offence to disclose any official information without lawful authority. It was only after nearly 80 years that the Official Secrets Act 1989 replaced this provision in the 1911 Act.

Section 1 - Penalties for spying

This section is very broadly drafted.

Section 1(1)

This subsection reads as amended:

The words in square brackets were inserted by section 10 of, and the First Schedule to, the Official Secrets Act 1920.

The words at the end of this subsection were repealed by section 11(2) of, and the first paragraph of the Second Schedule to, the Official Secrets Act 1920. They are replaced by section 8(1) of that Act.

"For any purpose prejudicial to the safety or interests of the State"

See Chandler v. DPP [1964] AC 763, [1962] 3 All ER 142, HL

"Prohibited place", s. 1(1)(a)

This expression is defined by section 3 of the Act.

"Enemy", s. 1(1)(b) and (c)

The expression "enemy" includes a potential enemy.

"Felony"

See Criminal Law Act 1967, the Criminal Law Act (Northern Ireland) 1967, and section 8(1) of the Official Secrets Act 1920

Evidence and presumptions

See section 1(2) of this Act and section 2 of the Official Secrets Act 1920.

Mode of trial

This is an indictable-only offence.

Sentence

A person guilty of an offence under this section is liable to imprisonment for a term not exceeding fourteen years.

Examples

Hillaire Barnett described sentences for espionage as "swingeing".

George Blake was sentenced to imprisonment for a term of 42 years after pleading guilty to five counts of unlawfully disclosing information contrary to section 1(1)(c). Geoffrey Prime was sentenced to imprisonment for a total of 35 years for disclosing material while employed at GCHQ. Michael Bettany was sentenced to imprisonment for a total of 23 years. Michael Smith was sentenced to imprisonment for 20 years (reduced from 25 on appeal).

History

From 1911 to 1920, an offence under this section was punishable with penal servitude for any term not less than three years and not exceeding seven years.

Inchoate offences

See section 7 of the Official Secrets Act 1920.

Related offences

See section 6 of the Official Secrets Act 1920 and section 5(6) of the Official Secrets Act 1989.

Section 1(2)

This subsection applies to prosecutions under section 1 of the Official Secrets Act 1920 as it applies to prosecutions under section 1 of this Act. It now reads:

The words in square brackets were inserted by the Official Secrets Act 1920.

Section 2 - Wrongful communication, &c. of information
This section was repealed for the United Kingdom on 1 March 1990. It has been replaced for the United Kingdom by the Official Secrets Act 1989.

Cases under this section

See Edgar Lansbury
The Isis magazine case.
R v. Aitken, Cairns and another (1971) Unreported, Crown Ct.
R v. Aubrey, Berry and Campbell (the ABC trial).
R v. Tisdall (1984) The Times, 26 March 1984 (see Sarah Tisdall).
R v. Ponting [1985] Crim LR 318, Crown Ct (see Clive Ponting).

Command papers on this section

Departmental Committee on Section 2 of the Official Secrets Act 1911 (Cmnd. 5104) (1972) - the Franks Committee.
Reform of Section 2 of the Official Secrets Act 1911 (Cmnd. 7285) (1978)
Reform of Section 2 of the Official Secrets Act 1911 (Cm. 408) (June 1988)

Section 3 - Definition of prohibited place

The words in square brackets were inserted or substituted by the Official Secrets Act 1920.

"ship"

References in this Act, whatever their terms, to ships, vessels or boats or activities or places connected therewith are to be construed as including references to hovercraft and activities and places connected with hovercraft.

"any place belonging to or used for the purposes of His Majesty", s.3(c)"

For the purposes of section 3(c), a place belonging to or used for the purposes of the Civil Aviation Authority is deemed to be a place belonging to Her Majesty.

For the purposes of section 3(c), any place belonging to or used for the purposes of the United Kingdom Atomic Energy Authority is deemed to be a place belonging to or used for the purposes of Her Majesty.

For the purposes of section 3(c), every "site to which a permit applies" (within the meaning of paragraph 1 of Schedule 1 to the Nuclear Installations Act 1965) is deemed to be a place belonging to or used for the purposes of Her Majesty.

Places declared to be prohibited places under section 3(c)

Each of the following places, being a site belonging to or used for the purposes of the United Kingdom Atomic Energy Authority, has, on the ground that information with respect thereto, or damage thereto, would be useful to an enemy, been declared to be a prohibited place for the purpose of this section:
The United Kingdom Atomic Energy Authority site at Harwell, Didcot, Oxfordshire, OX11 0RA.
The United Kingdom Atomic Energy Authority site at Windscale, Seascale, Cumbria, CA20 1PF.

Each of the following places, being a site to which a permit applies within the meaning of paragraph 1 of Schedule 1 to the Nuclear Installations Act 1965, has, on the ground that information with respect thereto, or damage thereto, would be useful to an enemy, been declared to be a prohibited place for the purpose of this section:
The British Nuclear Fuels plc site at Sellafield, Seascale, Cumbria, CA20 1PG.
The British Nuclear Fuels plc site at Capenhurst, near Chester, Cheshire, CH1 6ER.
The Urenco (Capenhurst) Limited site at Capenhurst, near Chester, Cheshire, CH1 6ER.

Orders made under section 3(c)
The Official Secrets (Prohibited Place) Order 1955 (S.I. 1955/1497 (S. 136))
The Official Secrets (Prohibited Places) Order 1975 (S.I. 1975/182)
The Official Secrets (Prohibited Places) (Amendment) Order 1993 (S.I. 1993/863)
The Official Secrets (Prohibited Places) Order 1994

Electronic communications stations and offices

Any electronic communications station or office belonging to, or occupied by, the provider of a public electronic communications service is a prohibited place for the purposes of this Act.

History

From 1984 to 2003, any telecommunications station or office belonging to, or occupied by, a public telecommunications operator was a prohibited place for the purposes of this Act.

Section 7 - Penalty for harbouring spies

This section now provides:

The words in square brackets were substituted for the words "wilfully refuses" by section 10 of, and the First Schedule to, the Official Secrets Act 1920.

The words at the end of this subsection were repealed by section 11(2) of, and the first paragraph of the Second Schedule to, the Official Secrets Act 1920. They are replaced by section 8(1) of that Act.

"Misdemeanour"

See the Criminal Law Act 1967, the Criminal Law Act (Northern Ireland) 1967 and section 8(2) of the Official Secrets Act 1920.

Sentence

A person guilty of an offence under this section is liable on conviction on indictment to imprisonment for a term not exceeding two years, or on summary conviction to imprisonment for a term not exceeding three months, or to a fine not exceeding the prescribed sum, or to both.

History

From 1911 to 1920, a person guilty of an offence under this section was liable to imprisonment with or without hard labour for a term not exceeding one year, or to a fine,
or to both imprisonment and a fine.

Section 8 - Restriction on prosecution

This section provides that a prosecution for an offence under this Act may only be instituted by, or with the consent of, the Attorney General.

Section 9 - Search warrants
This section now provides:

The words "named therein" in square brackets in section 9(1) were repealed for England and Wales by section 119(2) of, and Part I of Schedule 7 to, the Police and Criminal Evidence Act 1984.

Section 9(1) is extended by section 11(3) of the Official Secrets Act 1989.

"Oath", s.9(1)

This expression includes affirmation and declaration.

Section 11- Saving for laws of British possessions
This section now provides:

The words omitted were repealed by section 1(1) of, and Part XII of Schedule 1 to, the Statute Law (Repeals) Act 1986.

The power conferred by this section has been exercised by the following Orders:
The Official Secrets (Commonwealth of Australia) Order in Council 1915 (S.R. & O 1915/1199)
The Official Secrets (Jersey) Order in Council 1952 (S.I. 1952/1034)

Section 13 - Short title and repeal

Section 13(2) repealed the Official Secrets Act 1889. It was repealed by the Statute Law Revision Act 1927 because it was spent by virtue of the Interpretation Act 1889 (effect of repeal).

European Communities Act 1972

Section 11(2) of the European Communities Act 1972 must be construed and the Official Secrets Acts 1911 to 1939 have effect, as if that section were contained in this Act but so that sections 10 and 11, except section 10(4), do not apply.

See also
Official Secrets Act
Zircon affair
Defense Secrets Act of 1911 (United States)

References
Halsbury's Statutes,

External links
The Official Secrets Act 1911, as amended, from the National Archives.
The Official Secrets Act 1911, as originally enacted, from the National Archives.

Parliamentary debates
 http://hansard.millbanksystems.com/lords/1911/jul/17/official-secrets-bill-hl
 http://hansard.millbanksystems.com/lords/1911/jul/25/official-secrets-bill-hl
 http://hansard.millbanksystems.com/lords/1911/aug/01/official-secrets-bill-hl
 http://hansard.millbanksystems.com/lords/1911/aug/02/official-secrets-bill-hl
 http://hansard.millbanksystems.com/commons/1911/aug/17/official-secrets-bill-lords
 http://hansard.millbanksystems.com/commons/1911/aug/18/official-secrets-bill-lords
 http://hansard.millbanksystems.com/commons/1911/aug/18/clause-1-penalties-for-spying
 http://hansard.millbanksystems.com/lords/1911/aug/18/official-secrets-bill-hl
 http://hansard.millbanksystems.com/commons/1911/aug/22/royal-assent

United Kingdom Acts of Parliament 1911
Classified information in the United Kingdom